Estrella or La Estrella (Spanish for "the star") may refer to:

Places

Philippines
 Estrella Flyover, a two-lane flyover (overpass) in Metro Manila, Philippines
 Estrella Hospital, in the Province of Cavite, Philippines
 Estrella Street, in Metro Manila, Philippines
 Estrella–Pantaleon Bridge, in Metro Manila, Philippines

Spain
 Estrella (Madrid), a ward in the Retiro district of Madrid, Spain
 Estrella (Madrid Metro), a subway station
 Estrella Castle, in Montiel, province of Ciudad Real, Spain
 La Estrella, Spain, a village in the province of Toledo

United States
Listed alphabetically by state
 Estrella, Goodyear, a community in Maricopa County, Arizona
 Estrella Falls, a regional shopping mall and mixed-use complex in Goodyear, Arizona
 Estrella Freeway, a local name for Arizona State Route 303 in metropolitan Phoenix, Arizona
 Estrella Jail, in Phoenix, Arizona
 Estrella Mountain Community College, in Avondale, Arizona
 Sierra Estrella, a mountain range located southwest of Phoenix, Arizona
 Estrella River, in San Luis Obispo County, California
 Estrella Warbird Museum, at Paso Robles Municipal Airport in California
 Estrella, Colorado, an unincorporated community in Alamosa County, Colorado

Elsewhere
Listed alphabetically by country
 Estrella, Belize, a village in the Corozal District of Belize
 La Estrella, Chile, a town and commune in Chile
 La Estrella, Antioquia, a town and municipality in Colombia
 La Estrella station, a station of the Medellín Metro
 Estrella River (Costa Rica)
 La Estrella, Chiriquí, a corregimiento in Panama

People

Given name
 Estrella Alfon (1917–1983), Filipina author
 Estrella Archs (born 1974), Spanish fashion designer
 Estrella del Valle (born 1971), Mexican poet
Estrella Durá (born 1963), Spanish academic and politician
 Estrella Lin (born 1980), Taiwanese singer
 Estrella María Benzo Blas (born 1985), Spanish singer
 Estrella Morente (born 1980), Spanish singer
 Estrella Cabeza Candela (born 1987), Spanish tennis player

Surname
 Alberto Estrella (born 1962), Mexican actor
 Alvaro Estrella (born 1980), Swedish singer and dancer
 Conrado Estrella Sr. (1917–2011), Filipino politician
 Conrado Estrella III (born 1960), Filipino politician
 Eduardo Estrella (born 1953), Dominican entrepreneur and politician
 Hony Estrella (born 1984), Dominican actress
 Leo Estrella (born 1975), Dominican baseball player
 Linda Estrella (1922–2012), Filipina actress
 Miguel Ángel Estrella (1940–2022), Argentine pianist and ambassador
 Ulises Estrella (1939–2014), Ecuadorian poet

Brands and companies
 Estrella (snack brand), a Swedish snack food company formerly owned by Kraft Foods
 Estrella Damm, a Spanish beer
 Estrella Galicia, a Spanish beer
 Kawasaki Estrella, a 250cc motorcycle
 El Tren Estrella, a Spanish night train operated by RENFE rail service

Film and TV
 Estrella TV, an American Spanish-language TV network
 La Estrella (film), a 2013 Spanish film
 Las Estrellas, one of the cornerstone networks of Televisa in Mexico
 Las Estrellas (TV series), a 2017–2018 Argentine telenovela

Music
 Estrella, a section of the piano composition Carnaval by Robert Schumann
 Estrella (album), a 1998 album (and song on that album) by darkwave band Lycia
 "Estrella", a song by Cinerama from their 2002 album Torino
 Estrellas (album), a 1995 album by Gipsy Kings

Sports
 Estrella CF, a football club based in Santa Lucía de Tirajana, Canary Islands, Spain
 SV Estrella, a football club based in Papilon, Santa Cruz, Aruba
 UC La Estrella, a football club based in Los Santos de Maimona, Extremadura, Spain

Other uses
 11697 Estrella, an asteroid
 Estrella, an 1853 British paddle steamship, known as USS Estrella in Union Navy service
 Estrella War, an annual event in Arizona hosted by the Society for Creative Anachronism
 La Estrella de Panamá, a Panamanian daily newspaper
 Mescinia estrella, a moth of family Pyralidae

See also

Estrela (disambiguation)